Pukhulachhi is a village and former Village Development Committee around the old Newari town of Sankhu that is now part of Shankharapur Municipality in Kathmandu District in Province No. 3 of central Nepal. At the time of the 1991 Nepal census it had a population of 2,760 living in 430 households.

References

Populated places in Kathmandu District